Euphaedra procera is a butterfly in the family Nymphalidae. It is found in the southern part of the Central African Republic, the northern part of the Democratic Republic of the Congo and western Uganda.

References

Butterflies described in 1984
procera